The Shimla Chandigarh Expressway is an under construction   long expressway connecting Chandigarh to Shimla stretch of National Highway 5 (India).The four laning project involves the creation of 11 tunnels between Maliana (Shimla) and Kothi to help reduce the distance by 19 km. The total length of the tunnels will be 9.5 km. The two longest tunnels will be of 2.27 km each between Taradevi and Shogi and Kandaghat and Solan. The state government wants that the highway be realigned and include more tunnels to reduce the distance by another 20 km. The Himalayan expressway stretch of it was opened in June 2021.

References

Expressways in Himachal Pradesh
Proposed roads in India
Transport in Shimla
Transport in Chandigarh
Roads in Himachal Pradesh
Expressways in Chandigarh